Oxenhorn is a surname. Notable people with the surname include:

Harvey Oxenhorn (1952–1990), American academic and author
Mera J. Flaumenhaft (née Oxenhorn, 1945–2018), American academic and translator
Joseph Oxenhorn (1914–1989), American educator and author
Wendy Oxenhorn, American businesswoman and musician